The Pityusic Islands, often referenced simply as the Pityuses (from the Greek πιτύα pitýa, pine tree), or commonly but informally (and ambiguously) as the Pine Islands, is the name given collectively to the Balearic Islands of Ibiza (Catalan: Eivissa), Formentera, S'Espalmador and other small islets in the Mediterranean Sea.

Geography 

History 
The first known name of the islands was the Ancient Greek geonym Πιτυοῦσσαι Pityûssai ("covered in pine trees").

From about 200 BCE, the islands were used as a base by Cilician pirates. They and a renegade Roman general, Quintus Sertorius, who had formed an alliance with the pirates, were driven out by a large Roman fleet, commanded by Caius Annius Luscus.

The two largest of the islands, under the names Ebyssus (Ibiza) and Ophiusis (Formentera), were listed in Claudius Ptolemy's Geography (2nd century CE). Ptolemy noted that Ebyssus had a town by the same name.

Administration 
The Pine Islands are sometimes grouped together as part of the Balearic Islands, or else considered separate with the Balearics proper being Mallorca and Menorca (which together with their islets form the Gymnesian Islands). Politically, they are part of the autonomous community of the Balearic Islands.

Initially, they were administratively part of the same insular council (of Ibiza and Formentera), but since 2007 they are now separated between the insular council of Ibiza and the insular council of Formentera (each one is also assimilated to a single comarca), which are two of the four main administrative subdivisions of the province (and autonomous community) of the Balearic Islands.

Gallery

Flags and coats of arms

See also 
 Gymnesian Islands (Illes Gimnèsies)

Further reading

External links 

Islands of the Balearic Islands